Malik Mazhar Abbas Raan (1 February 1953 – 16 January 2019) was a Pakistani politician who was a Member of the Provincial Assembly of the Punjab from 1997 to 1999, from May 2013 to May 2018 and again from July 2018 to January 2019.

Early life and education
He was born on 1 February 1953 in Multan.

He graduated from Government Emerson College in 1978 and has the degree of Bachelor of Arts.

Political career
He ran for the seat of the Provincial Assembly of the Punjab as a candidate of Pakistan Peoples Party (PPP) from Constituency PP-166 (Multan-VII) in 1988 Pakistani general election, but was unsuccessful. He received 21,059 votes and lost the seat to Shah Mehmood Qureshi.

He ran for the seat of the Provincial Assembly of the Punjab as a candidate of Pakistan Democratic Alliance (PDA) from Constituency PP-166 (Multan-VII) in 1990 Pakistani general election, but was unsuccessful. He received 22,719 votes and lost the seat to Shah Mehmood Qureshi.

He was elected to the Provincial Assembly of the Punjab as a candidate of Pakistan Muslim League (N) (PML-N) from Constituency PP-166 (Multan-VII) in 1997 Pakistani general election. He received 22,193 votes and defeated Sajjad Hussain Qureshi.

He ran for the seat of the Provincial Assembly of the Punjab as a candidate of PML-N from Constituency PP-201 (Multan-VIII) in 2002 Pakistani general election, but was unsuccessful. He received 25,005 votes and lost the seat to Malik Muhammad Arshad Ran, a candidate of PPP.

He ran for the seat of the Provincial Assembly of the Punjab as a candidate of Pakistan Muslim League (Q) (PML-Q) from Constituency PP-201 (Multan-VIII) in 2008 Pakistani general election, but was unsuccessful. He received 25,412 votes and lost the seat to Malik Muhammad Abbas Raan, a candidate of PPP.

He was re-elected to the Provincial Assembly of the Punjab as a candidate of PML-N from Constituency PP-201 (Multan-VIII) in 2013 Pakistani general election. He received 35,233 votes and defeated Makhdoom Mureed Hussain Qureshi, a candidate of PPP.

He was re-elected to Provincial Assembly of the Punjab as a candidate of Pakistan Tehreek-e-Insaf (PTI) from Constituency PP-218 (Multan-VIII) in 2018 Pakistani general election.

He died on 16 January 2019 of cardiac arrest in Lahore.

References

1953 births
2019 deaths
Punjab MPAs 2013–2018
Pakistan Muslim League (N) politicians
Punjab MPAs 1997–1999
Pakistan Tehreek-e-Insaf MPAs (Punjab)
Punjab MPAs 2018–2023
Politicians from Multan